Schwertner, Schwerdtner are German surnames:

 David Schwertner (Schwerdtner) (1625, Chrastava - 1666), Bohemian-German ethnologist and Lutheran theologian
 Augustus John Schwertner (1870 - 1939), an American prelate of the Roman Catholic Church
  (1918, Neunkirchen/Saar - 1965), German politician (FDP, DPS)
  (born 1932, Liberec), Bohemian-German politician (DDR)

Schwerdtner 

 David Schwerdtner (1625 - 1666), German ethnologist and Lutheran theologian
  (1938, Heidenheim/Brenz - 2006), German jurist
 Maren Schwerdtner (born 1985, Hanover), German heptathlete

See also 
 Schwertner, Texas, an unincorporated community in Williamson County, Texas, United States

References

See also 
 Schwerner (similar spelling)

German-language surnames
Surnames of Czech origin

de:Schwertner